The Chautauqua Pavilion is an octagonal pavilion located in Chautauqua Park in Hastings, Nebraska. The pavilion was constructed in 1907 for summer Chautauqua assemblies in Hastings. According to the Historic American Engineering Record, the pavilion's design is unique; in fact, the HAER does not have a name for certain design elements used in the pavilion. The building's pyramidal roof is supported by columns along the pavilion's perimeter; a triangular truss atop the columns acts as the pavilion's superstructure. A vent at the top of the roof is supported by a Howe truss. A stage and orchestra pit are located inside the pavilion, though the majority of the space inside the pavilion is open, allowing a variety of activities to be held there. The Hastings chapter of the Chautauqua movement held independent assemblies at the pavilion until 1913, when it merged with the national movement. Hastings continued to host Chautauqua events until the 1920s, when the movement declined due to the rise of film and radio.

The pavilion was added to the National Register of Historic Places on October 19, 1978.

References

External links

Event venues on the National Register of Historic Places in Nebraska
Buildings and structures completed in 1907
Buildings and structures in Hastings, Nebraska
Pavilions in the United States
Chautauqua
National Register of Historic Places in Adams County, Nebraska